Amblyocarenum is a genus of spider in the family Nemesiidae, found in southern Europe and the Mediterranean. It was formerly placed in the family Cyrtaucheniidae.

Species
, the World Spider Catalog accepted the following species:

Amblyocarenum doleschalli (Ausserer, 1871) – Italy, Sicily
Amblyocarenum nuragicus Decae, Colombo & Manunza, 2014 – Sardinia
Amblyocarenum obscurus (Ausserer, 1871) – Sicily
Amblyocarenum walckenaeri (Lucas, 1846) (type species) – Mediterranean

References

Nemesiidae
Mygalomorphae genera